Salvia deserta is a perennial plant that is native to Xinjiang province in China, and the countries of Kazakhstan and Kyrgyzstan.

It is very closely related to Salvia nemorosa, and is distinguished by having purple-red bracts.

Notes

deserta
Flora of Xinjiang
Flora of Kyrgyzstan
Flora of Kazakhstan